The State Register of Heritage Places is maintained by the Heritage Council of Western Australia. , 29 places are heritage-listed in the Shire of Cunderdin, of which five are on the State Register of Heritage Places.

List
The Western Australian State Register of Heritage Places, lists the following five state registered places within the Shire of Cunderdin:

References

Cunderdin
Cunderdin